One male athlete from Qatar competed at the 1996 Summer Paralympics in Atlanta, United States.

See also
Qatar at the Paralympics
Qatar at the 1996 Summer Olympics

References 

Nations at the 1996 Summer Paralympics
1996
Summer Paralympics